Lake Ilmen is a large lake in the Novgorod Oblast of Russia. A historically important lake, it formed a vital part of the medieval trade route from the Varangians to the Greeks. The city of Novgorod - which is a major trade-center of the route - lies six kilometers below the lake's outflow.

According to the Max Vasmer's Etymological Dictionary, the name of the lake originates from the Finnic Ilmajärvi, which means "air lake". Thanks to Novgorodian colonisation,  many lakes in Russia have names deriving from Lake Ilmen. Yuri Otkupshchikov has argued that the presence of the name "Ilmen" in Southern Russia can't be explained by the Novgorodian colonisation alone, and proposed a Slavic etymology instead.

The lake is fed by 52 inflowing rivers, the four main ones being the Msta, the Pola, the Lovat, and the Shelon. It is drained through a single outlet, the Volkhov, into Lake Ladoga, and subsequently via the Neva into the Gulf of Finland. The source of the Volkhov is marked by the Peryn Chapel built in the 1220s.

The basin of Lake Ilmen contains vast areas in Novgorod, Pskov, and Tver Oblasts of Russia, as well as minor areas in the north of Vitebsk Region in Belarus.

The water level is regulated by the Volkhov hydroelectric plant situated downstream the Volkhov River. Water temperature in July is 19-20 °C. The bathing season is about 90 days.

Lake Ilmen is navigable. Shipping lines are Veliky Novgorod – Staraya Russa and Veliky Novgorod – Shimsk. There is a fishery in the lake.

The lake area was the location of an important battle during World War II, the Demyansk Pocket.

References

Ilmen
LIlmen